Bust No. 535 of the Torlonia Collection, also called the Patrician Torlonia, is a marble bust, sometimes said to portray Marcus Porcius Cato Censorius, though also noted as being of "an unknown Roman politician". It is a copy of a Tiberian era bust (1st century AD), itself thought to be a copy of an original dating from around 80–70 BC.

References

Busts (sculpture)
1st-century Roman sculptures